Reflecting roadstud may refer to:

 the cat's eye, a retroreflective safety device used in road marking
 Reflecting Roadstuds Ltd, the company founded by the inventor of the cat's eye